Fort Bowie was a 19th-century outpost of the United States Army located in southeastern Arizona near the present day town of Willcox, Arizona.  The remaining buildings and site are now protected as Fort Bowie National Historic Site.

Fort Bowie was established by the California Volunteers in 1862, after a series of engagements between the California Column and the Chiricahua Apaches. The most violent of these conflicts was the Battle of Apache Pass in July 1862. The fort was named in honor of Colonel George Washington Bowie commander of the 5th Regiment California Volunteer Infantry who first established the fort. The first Fort Bowie resembled a temporary camp rather than a permanent army post. In 1868, a second, more substantial Fort Bowie was built which included adobe barracks, houses, corrals, a trading post, and a hospital. For more than 30 years Fort Bowie and Apache Pass were the focal point of military operations eventually culminating in the surrender of Geronimo in 1886 and the banishment of the Chiricahuas to Florida and Alabama. The fort was abandoned in 1894.

History

There were two engagements between the United States Army and the Chiricahua that led to the construction of Fort Bowie in 1862. The first engagement, known as the Bascom Affair, took place in January 1861 when a band of Apaches raided the ranch of John Ward. Ward mistakenly believed that Cochise and the Chiricahua Apaches were responsible for the raid and demanded that the military take action against Cochise to recover property stolen during the raid. The next month, the army responded to Ward's request by sending Lieutenant George Nicholas Bascom and fifty-four men to Apache Pass to confront Cochise. Bascom managed to capture Cochise and threatened to hold him hostage until Ward's property was returned but the Apache leader managed to escape. Sporadic fighting between Cochise's warriors and Army troops would continue for years to come.

The second major engagement was the Battle of Apache Pass, fought from July 15 to July 16, 1862. A Union regiment under Brigadier General James Henry Carleton was ambushed by a band of Apaches while en route from California to New Mexico where they were to confront Confederate troops. This battle led to the eventual establishment of Fort Bowie in order to protect Apache Pass and an important source of water, Apache Spring. Construction on the first Fort Bowie began in 1862 but this resembled a temporary camp rather than a permanent military fort. For more than 30 years Fort Bowie and Apache Pass were the focal point of military operations eventually culminating in the surrender of Geronimo in 1886 and the banishment of the Chiricahuas to Florida and Alabama. The fort was abandoned in 1894.

Commanders 
 Major Theodore H. Coult July 1862 – September 1862
 Captain Hugh L. Hinds September 1862 – May 1863

Garrisons of Fort Bowie 
 Company G, 5th California Infantry. July 1862 – January 1863
 Company E, 5th California Infantry. January 1863 – May 1863
 Company K, 5th California Infantry. May 1864 – September 1864
 ?
 Company L, 1st California Cavalry. June 1865 – January 1866
 ?
 Company L, 1st California Cavalry. March 1866 – April 1866

Demographics

Fort Bowie first reported on the 1870 U.S. Census as "Apache Pass." It featured 400 residents, all White. It tied with Adamsville for the distinction of the 4th largest community in the Arizona Territory. At the time, it was located in Pima County. In 1880, it reported as "Camp Bowie" with 184 residents (the racial demographics were not reported). In 1881, Fort Bowie was drawn into the newly-created county of Cochise. Although Fort Bowie was still in existence as an active U.S. Army facility, it did not report a population for 1890. It would be formally closed down 4 years later. It has not reported on the census to date.

Fort Bowie today

The Fort Bowie and Apache Pass site was declared a National Historic Landmark in 1960.

The remains of Fort Bowie are carefully preserved, as are the adobe walls of various post buildings and the ruins of a Butterfield Stage Station. The site is located on the unpaved Apache Pass Road which can be accessed from Interstate 10 near Bowie, Arizona or from Arizona Highway 186 just north of the entrance to Chiricahua National Monument. Access to the ruins of Fort Bowie and the visitor center is via a  foot trail which begins at a parking area along Apache Pass Road.  This trail to the old fort passes other historic sites such as Apache Spring, Siphon Canyon, the ruins of the Butterfield Stage Stop and Bascom's Camp.

US Army soldier Orizoba Spence, who received the Medal of Honor during the Indian Wars is buried in the post cemetery

In 1958 a Western entitled Fort Bowie was made, starring Ben Johnson. The film charted one of the disputes between the US Cavalry based at the fort and the Apaches.

Gallery

See also
Bear Spring House, Guardhouse, and Spring

References

 Douglas C. McChristian, Fort Bowie, Arizona: Combat Post of the Southwest, 1858–1894, University of Oklahoma Press, 2006.

External links

 American Southwest, a National Park Service Discover Our Shared Heritage Travel Itinerary
 Park Map of Fort Bowie National Historitc Site
 National Park Service: Fort Bowie National Historitc Site
 
 
 
 
 
 
 
 
 
 
 
 Photos of the Fort Bowie, Stage Station (Ruins) from Our Oasis, Fort Bowie and Apache Pass.  Note differences between these photos and the old B/W photo purported to be the stage station.  That old photo looks like some ruins of the Old Fort Bowie on the hill between the cemetery and the second site of Fort Bowie.
 
 
 
 

Archaeological sites in Arizona
National Historic Landmarks in Arizona
National Historic Sites in Arizona
Protected areas of Cochise County, Arizona
Native American history of Arizona
Museums in Cochise County, Arizona
Military and war museums in Arizona
Bowie
Arizona Territory
Buildings and structures in Cochise County, Arizona
Bowie
Ruins in the United States
History of Cochise County, Arizona
Historic American Buildings Survey in Arizona
Bowie
1864 establishments in Arizona Territory
1862 establishments in the United States
National Register of Historic Places in Cochise County, Arizona